The Avukana statue is a standing statue of the Buddha near Kekirawa in North Central Sri Lanka. The Avukana statue is one of the best examples of a standing statue built in Sri Lanka. It is now a popular tourist attraction.

Location and appearance
The Avukana statue is located in the village of Avukana (also spelled Aukana) near Kekirawa. It figure is set in a slight hollow and faces east, looking toward the Kala Wewa reservoir. It was carved out of a large granite rock face, but is not completely separated. A narrow strip of rock has been left at the back of the statue, connecting it to the rock to support it. The rock face behind the image is carved like Cyclopean masonry, to give the appearance of mountain. The pedestal on which the Buddha stands takes the form of a lotus flower.

The statue was set within a large image house or shrine, of which parts of the lower walls still remain. The structure had a stone foundation with the upper portions made of brick.

Characteristics
The Avukana statue is considered to be one of the best examples of a standing statue of the Buddha from ancient Sri Lanka. The Avukana statue shows some influence of the Gandhara school of art, as well as the Amaravati school of India. The robe is worn tightly, clearly outlining the shape of the body, and its pleats are carved clearly and delicately. It is worn over the left shoulder, and the right shoulder is bare, as is the tradition in Buddha statues of Sri Lanka. The Buddha's body is straight, and the left hand clutches the robe at the left shoulder. The right hand is raised up to the right shoulder, with the palm facing left. This position is known as the Asisa mudra, a variation of the Abhaya mudra.

Dating

The Avukana statue is widely believed to have been constructed in the 5th century, but a number of opinions have been expressed from the time of Harry Charles Purvis Bell, Ananda Coomaraswamy and Senarath Paranavithana. A comprehensive review of the evidence, and a close assessment of the sculpture's style, was undertaken by Diran K. Dohanian, who concluded, based on comparisons with Buddhas elsewhere in Sri Lanka and those produced for the Amaravati school, that the Aukana Buddha belongs to the 8th century. This is confirmed by a donative inscription, found in 1951 in the north wall of the shrine, that is written in Sinhala and dates to the 8th century.

Legends
While the statue is often said to been made at the behest of King Dhatusena, another theory is that it was done by an individual named Barana. There is another nearby standing statue of the Buddha, quite similar to the Avukana statue, at Sasseruwa. According to legend, the two statues are the result of a competition between a stone sculpting guru (master) and gola (pupil). The story goes that the master constructed the Avukana statue, while the pupil made the statue at Sasseruwa. The first to complete his statue had to notify the other by ringing a bell. The master managed to complete his statue first and won the competition. This is said to be why the Sasseruwa statue is unfinished. The Avukana statue is considered to be the better of the two, and similarities between them have led historians to believe that the story is actually true. However, that is a mere legend as the Sasseruwa stature was built nearly four hundred years prior to the Avukana Buddha image. Reswehera Rajamaha Vihara is an ancient temple which was built by the king Devanampiya Tissa (307-267 BC).

Current situation
Today, pilgrims visit the statue from all parts of the country and the Avukana statue has become a popular tourist attraction. Although the site lacked many facilities, it has now been improved by the Department of Archaeology and the Civil Defence Force.

See also
Buduruvagala
Maligawila Buddha statue
Samadhi statue
Toluvila statue
List of colossal sculptures in situ

References

Further reading
von Schroeder, Ulrich (1990). Buddhist Sculptures of Sri Lanka. (752 p.; 1620 illustrations). Hong Kong: Visual Dharma Publications, Ltd.

External links 

Anuradhapura period
Colossal Buddha statues
5th-century works
Tourist attractions in North Central Province, Sri Lanka
Buildings and structures in North Central Province, Sri Lanka
Archaeological protected monuments in Anuradhapura District
Unfinished sculptures